Filippo Campioli (born 21 February 1982) is a former high jumper from Italy. His personal best jump is 2.30 metres, achieved in June 2008 in Formia.

Biography
He finished tenth at the 2008 Olympic Games. He also competed at the 2007 European Indoor Championships and the 2008 World Indoor Championships without reaching the final.

Achievements

National titles
Filippo Campioli has won 4 times the individual national championship.
3 wins in the high jump (2007, 2008, 2010)
1 win in the high jump indoor (2008)

See also
Italian all-time top lists - High jump

References

External links
 

1982 births
Living people
Italian male high jumpers
Athletes (track and field) at the 2008 Summer Olympics
Olympic athletes of Italy